Canadian Forces Station Coverdale was a HFDF intercept station near Moncton, New Brunswick during World War 2.

The station was called HMCS COVERDALE from 1949, and then to CFS Coverdale in 1966.

The station was closed in 1971.

External links
 www.rcsigs.ca Coverdale
 CFS Coverdale

Coverdale
Coverdale
1971 disestablishments in New Brunswick
1942 establishments in New Brunswick